The Granada Metro (Metro de Granada in Spanish) is a single light rail line in the city of Granada, Spain and its metropolitan area. It crosses Granada and covers the towns of Albolote, Maracena and Armilla, with underground sections in central Granada and overground sections elsewhere. The line opened on 21 September 2017, and serves 26 stations, of which 3 stations in central Granada are underground.

Construction of the line began in 2007. The metro was initially planned to open in early 2012, and by May 2011 the line was 73% completed. However, funding ran out as a result of the Spanish economic crisis, with only 250 million of the estimated 502 million euros total cost available. In 2012, the remaining funds were secured through a 260 million loan from the European Investment Bank. and the planned date of completion was moved to early 2014. However, further delays resulted in a shortfall in funding, which was only resolved on 1 July 2014.

The metro finally opened at noon 21 September 2017.

Future expansion 

Owing to the higher than expected ridership and success of the metro, extensions are proposed on the existing line; westward from Armilla splitting into two branches to Cúllar Vega and another to Alhendín, and northwest from Albolote to Pinos Puente and/or Atarfe and Santa Fe. New lines from Granada city centre to Peligros, Ogíjares and Federico García Lorca Granada Airport are also proposed.

Network Map

References

External links 

 Granada metro website
 Granada metro map on Google Maps
 First line route, Urbanrail.net
 pics of the system, public-transport.net

Tram transport in Spain
Light rail in Spain
Granada
Railway lines opened in 2017
Granada Metro